This article lists places of worship in the English town of Barrow-in-Furness. Barrow was a town built on industry and up until the late 19th century was only a small village. The population skyrocketed in a matter of decades to a peak of over 70,000, as a result the majority of the town's places of worship were built in the late 19th century and early 20th century. Many were only temporary timber structures and soon replaced by the present buildings. According to the 2001 UK Census, 81.03% of Barrow's population identified as Christian with 0.58% of individuals stating another religion (the majority being Muslims and Buddhists). However these figures are currently outdated, as even in 2001 7.59% of individuals didn't state a religion (as opposed to stating 'no religion') as well as the fact that between 2001 and 2007, the ethnic minority population of Barrow has almost trebled in size. All current places of worship in Barrow belong to denominations of Christianity, although three Jewish Synagogues were sited in the town in the early 20th century. Despite this, the Kadampa Buddhist Temple and Manjushri Mahayana Centre which are located on the outskirts of the borough are amongst the oldest Buddhist centres in the western world. The nearest Mosque to the town is sited in Lancaster, the nearest Synagogue in Blackpool and Gurudwara in Preston.

This list also includes churches in the wider Borough of Barrow-in-Furness.

Existing places of worship
Below is a list of current buildings that were purpose built as places of worship in Barrow-in-Furness.

Christian churches 
The borough has an estimated 33 active churches for 67,300 inhabitants, a ratio of one church for every 2,039 people.

Churches belonging to groups not universally recognised as Christian

Former places of worship
Below is a list of current or former buildings that were purpose built as places of worship in Barrow-in-Furness, but no longer serve this purpose.

See also

Barrow-in-Furness
Demographics of Cumbria
Bishop of Barrow-in-Furness

References

External links
 Barrow Borough Council – Places of Worship and Religious Groups

Religion in Cumbria
 
Religion
Barrow-in-Furness
Barrow-in-Furness
Lists of buildings and structures in Cumbria